Lycodon laoensis, commonly known as the Laotian wolf snake, is a species of nonvenomous colubrid snake endemic to Asia.

Geographic range

It is found in India, Thailand, Laos, Vietnam, Cambodia, China (Yunnan), and West Malaysia. It also has been reported in, Northern Pakistan, areas specially in Haripur District

Description
Dorsally it is dark brown, with a whitish or yellowish crossband on the occiput, and similar body crossbands which bifurcate on the sides. Ventrally it is whitish.  Adults are about .5 m (20 inches) in total length, which includes the tail of about 10 cm (4 inches).

They are nocturnal , and generally ground dwelling. They are not very aggressive and generally reluctant to bite.

Like other Wolf Snakes, they can be mistaken for the venomous Banded Kraits.

References

External links
 Laotian Wolf Snake in Thailand

Further reading
 Günther, A. (1864). The Reptiles of British India. (Taylor & Francis, printers). London. xxvii + 452 pp.
 Lanza, B. (1999). A new species of Lycodon from the Philippines, with a key to the genus (Reptilia: Serpentes: Colubridae). Tropical Zoology 12:89-104.

laoensis
Reptiles of Cambodia
Reptiles of China
Reptiles of India
Reptiles of Laos
Reptiles of Malaysia
Reptiles of Thailand
Reptiles of Vietnam
Taxa named by Albert Günther
Reptiles described in 1864
Snakes of China
Snakes of Vietnam
Snakes of Asia